George "Tiger" Haynes (December 13, 1914 - February 14, 1994), sometimes billed as Colonel Tiger Haynes, was an American actor of musical theatre, television and film and jazz musician.

He was born in Frederiksted, St. Croix, and moved to New York when he was a boy. An ex-boxer, Haynes played guitar with The Three Flames from 1945 to 1956, a group which had its own NBC radio show in the mid-1940s and a television show on NBC television in 1949, and which incorporated Sammy Benskin in 1954.

He made his mainstream Broadway debut in Leonard Sillman's musical revue New Faces of 1956. He is best known for his portrayal of the Tin Man in the original Broadway cast of The Wiz (a role assumed by Nipsey Russell in the 1978 film adaptation). He also made several television appearances on programs such as The Cosby Show (1989), In the Heat of the Night (1989), and Law & Order (1994), as well as numerous minor film appearances in films such as All That Jazz (1979) and Ratboy (1986).

Musicals
New Faces of 1956
Fade Out-Fade In
The Wiz
Louis (1981)

Films

References

External links

Tiger Haynes on Allmovie
Critics' Choices: "Broadcast TV" The New York Times
Tiger Haynes and Joy Hatton collection, Institute of Jazz Studies, Rutgers Libraries

1914 births
1994 deaths
African-American male actors
American male musical theatre actors
RCA Victor artists
People from Saint Croix, U.S. Virgin Islands
United States Virgin Islands musicians
United States Virgin Islands male actors
20th-century American male actors
African-American guitarists
20th-century American guitarists
American male guitarists
20th-century African-American male singers